Nicholas 'Nick' Charles Crawshaw (1963-2005) was a British international sports shooter and the Chief financial officer of the Financial Times.

Sports shooting career
Crawshaw represented England in the fullbore rifle Queens Prize and the fullbore rifle Queens Prize pair, at the 1986 Commonwealth Games in Edinburgh, Scotland.

Business career
He was the Managing Director of the Financial Times’ magazine before becoming the finance director of the Financial Times in 2004.

Army career
He was awarded an Order of the British Empire MBE in the 2000 New Year Honours, for his work in leading the army's career development programme.

References

1963 births
2005 deaths
British male sport shooters
Shooters at the 1986 Commonwealth Games
Commonwealth Games competitors for England